1721 Wells, provisional designation , is a dark asteroid from the outer region of the asteroid belt, approximately 44 kilometers in diameter.

It was discovered on 3 October 1953, by IU's Indiana Asteroid Program at Goethe Link Observatory near Brooklyn, Indiana, United States. It was named after UI's president and chancellor Herman B Wells.

Orbit and classification 

Wells orbits the Sun in the outer main-belt at a distance of 3.0–3.3 AU once every 5 years and 7 months (2,043 days). Its orbit has an eccentricity of 0.05 and an inclination of 16° with respect to the ecliptic.

Physical characteristics 

According to the survey carried out by NASA's Wide-field Infrared Survey Explorer with its subsequent NEOWISE mission, Wells measures 43.576 kilometers in diameter and its surface has an albedo of 0.045. It has an absolute magnitude of 10.9. As of 2017, Wells spectral type, rotation period and shape remain unknown.

Naming 

This minor planet was named in honor of Herman B Wells (1902–2000), chancellor and president and of Indiana University, who has transformed Indiana University from a provincial college into a world-renowned institution of higher learning. During this time, Wells also fostered higher education nationally and internationally. The official  was published by the Minor Planet Center on 15 June 1973.

References

External links 
 Asteroid Lightcurve Database (LCDB), query form (info )
 Dictionary of Minor Planet Names, Google books
 Asteroids and comets rotation curves, CdR – Observatoire de Genève, Raoul Behrend
 Discovery Circumstances: Numbered Minor Planets (1)-(5000)  – Minor Planet Center
 
 

001721
001721
Named minor planets
19531003